The Concerto for Orchestra is an orchestral composition by the American composer Joan Tower.  The work was jointly commissioned by the St. Louis Symphony, the Chicago Symphony Orchestra, and the New York Philharmonic.

Composition
The Concerto for Orchestra is composed in two connected sections and has a duration of roughly 30 minutes.  Tower described the composition in the score program note, writing:

Instrumentation
The work is scored for an orchestra comprising three flutes (doubling piccolo), two oboes, cor anglais, three clarinets (doubling E-flat clarinet and bass clarinet), three bassoons (doubling contrabassoon), four horns, three trumpets, three trombones, tuba, timpani, three percussionists, harp, piano, and strings.

Reception
The Concerto for Orchestra has received positive marks from critics.  Peter G. Davis of New York called it "a colorful and engaging piece that will surely take its place beside the composer's much-played Sequoia and Silver Ladders."  He added, "Although it lacks a catchy title, the one-movement score generates a similar sort of musical imagery, even if the basic idea is rather more abstract: a half-hour trip through a large landscape in which constantly changing musical shapes and gestures suggest a time span spent traversing great spaces and long distances."  David Gutman of Gramophone gave the concerto a more mixed review, however, remarking, "There are deliberate echoes of Bartok, Stravinsky and even Bernard Herrmann in the Concerto for Orchestra, as well as a welcome emphasis on rhythm and movement, but the work lacks the kind of distinctive material that would lift it onto another plane."

References

Concertos by Joan Tower
1991 compositions
Tower
Music commissioned by the Chicago Symphony Orchestra
Music commissioned by the New York Philharmonic
Music commissioned by the St. Louis Symphony